John Wesley Berry (1857 – August 13, 1931) was an American pioneer, businessman, and politician from Tacoma, Washington. His main business was flour and cereal production. Berry built the first oat and cereal mill of the west in Tacoma and established the Cascade Cereal Company, the second-most successful mill in the city. An experienced mechanic, Berry invented and patented the split pulley. He co-founded the Deming-Berry Company, which specialized in mechanical supplies manufacturing. Both of Berry's companies supplied their products to a number of state institutions, including schools and hospitals. 

Berry was a trustee and vice president of the Bank of Tacoma and incorporator of the Tacoma Brick Company and Sumner Grain & Milling Company. At the pinnacle of his political career in 1892–93, Berry was a Tacoma Councilman, losing this position after a water-plant purchase controversy. He also served as a superintendent and teacher at the Washington State Sunday School. 

In 1903, the Cascade Cereal Company and Deming-Berry Company were destroyed by fire, resulting in damages not fully covered by insurance. Berry lost his management positions in both companies. Later in his life, he worked as an insurance agent.

Early life, family and education

John Berry was born near Jacksonville, Illinois in 1857. He lived on a family farm and went to the local school until he was fourteen years old. He was a son of Preston A. Berry and Martha Jane Berry (Harris). Berry's father, born in Greenfield, Illinois, moved to a farm near Jacksonville, where he worked as a livestock merchant. Later, Preston took part in California Gold Rush, locating and then selling gold deposits in California. In later years, both parents joined their son in Tacoma.

Career

Illinois and Indiana 

At the age of fourteen, Berry decided to learn a trade. He found a job at a grist mill in Jacksonville and worked there for seven years, learning every detail of the business. Later, he spent a year working in Marion, Illinois, and then as a miller in Montezuma, Indiana. He worked at the mill until he was twenty-six years old, and then bought it to run the business himself. In 1887, he sold it and left the city.

First jobs in Tacoma, Washington

Berry came to Tacoma intending to work in flour and cereal production; however, the building boom of the city diverted him from his plans. In 1887, he became one of the incorporators and trustees for the Tacoma Brick Company, and worked as a brick maker for the following year and a half. His product was used for the base of the first four-story Tacoma building: the Northern Pacific Railway headquarters. For six months afterwards, Berry and his father worked as horse dealers.

Flour and cereal milling business

Eventually, Berry returned to his original plan, and started to work in the production of flour and cereal. In 1888, he built the mill on Jefferson Avenue, which was the first oat and cereal mill in the West. It was a five-story building that covered  of ground, furnished with "high-grade" equipment. The mill's products were praised as "the very best." In August 1892, Berry officially incorporated the Cascade Oatmeal Company and became its president. Charles W. Quinn, Berry's brother-in-law, was one of the proprietors.  

In 1892, the Cascade Oatmeal mill was engulfed in controversy, as it became the first mill in the state to struggle with weevils in their wheat. At first, the information was withheld, but later, the company's representatives asserted that the weevils had been imported with San Francisco wheat, and the local product was free of it. The same year, Berry's company purchased a share of the Oakesdale Milling Company flour mill. However, due to business difficulties, the partnership was soon dissolved and the mills in Tacoma and Oakesdale were temporarily closed. 

In 1893,the trade relationship between America and southeast Asia began. According to workers on the route, flour was in high demand, and the milling business was considered very profitable. By this time, Berry had already begun to expand a new flour mill producing a day. The new mill was located near the old one on Jefferson Avenue.

In 1895, the Cascade Oatmeal Company was reorganized into the Cascade Cereal Company of Tacoma, with incorporators John Berry, N. M. L. Berry, and M. E. Quinn. In 1900, the company expanded, building another warehouse and a plant for pearl barley production. Its output value was $300,000 ($785,000 in 2020 dollars). At the time, five Tacoma companies worked in the business, and their total output was appraised at $2,000,000 ($52,000,000). The Cascade Cereal Company was second in sales after the Puget Sound Flouring Mills, which had an output value of $1,500,00 ($39,000,000). Cascade Cereal Company successfully bid on government contracts and supplied its products to various state institutions, including the Western Washington hospital, the state reform school, and the Soldier's home.

During the U.S. economic depression of 1893–1897, Berry lost control of the mill. J. G. Deming became the president of the company, and Berry continued as its manager. Later, the company was bought by Albers Brothers, and Berry continued working under the presidency of Bernard Albers.

Business in mechanics

Berry was interested in mechanics throughout his life. Eventually, he invented and patented an "automatic self–tightening split–wood pulley." Deciding to pursue a career in this field, he was one of the organizers (in 1901), incorporators (in 1902), and at different times, a vice president, treasurer, and manager of the Deming-Berry Company (which replaced the Tacoma Automatic Scale Company). The new factory  manufactured and supplied automatic scales as well as pulleys, clutches, sprockets, and other mechanical devices. The company's building was located on Jefferson Avenue, alongside the Cascade Cereal mill.

At first, device production only required two employees, but the number of orders grew rapidly and the company soon needed to expand. There were plans to erect a much bigger manufacturing plant on Center Street. The planned facility, powered by electricity, included a two-story brick factory, warehouse, and a brick kiln. The plans were ruined by the fire that destroyed two of Berry's establishments with all of the equipment.

The fire and its aftermath

On July 24, 1903, the Cascade Cereal Company, the Deming-Berry Company, and all of the machinery for the new factory were destroyed by fire. It took 35 minutes for the Cascade mill building to collapse, and for the fire to spread to neighboring buildings. 

The generally accepted cause of the fire was a spark from a passing locomotive that ignited the shavings in one of the Cascade mill rooms on the ground floor. In the annual fire department report, the fire was named one of the four "largest fires the department ever had to handle." The report appraised the financial loss of the fire at $97,000 ($2,500,000).

Berry's total loss was appraised at $125,000 ($3,270,000); and the worth of the destroyed property was estimated at $150,000 ($4,000,000). Berry himself declared his loss "a heavy one" and "one which will prove a hard blow to the two big establishments." At the time, the Cascade Cereal mill's worth was estimated at $90,000 ($2,300,000), and the pulley factory's value was $45,000 ($1,100,000). The total insurance payment for both buildings was about $80,000 ($2,000,000).

Later career

After the fire, Berry left the milling business, instead working as a real estate loans and insurance agent. He became a member of the Berry & Spaulding Company and the president of the B. S. Security Co. 

In later years, Berry was occasionally involved in the milling business. In 1913 he was put in charge of the new flour, cereal and feed mill established by the businessmen of the Consumers' Manufacturing & Supply Association. Later, in 1921, he was also among the incorporators for the Sumner Grain & Milling Company in Sumner, Washington.

Other positions

In February 1894, Berry became a trustee for the officially incorporated Bank of Tacoma. Later that year he served as its director, and in 1895, he became a vice president of the bank.

For seven years Berry was a superintendent of the Washington State Sunday School and taught a class of twenty-five girls. In 1900, he was among the members of the executive committee for the Sunday School convention.

Political activity

Berry actively participated in the social and political life of the city. In 1892–1893, he served as an independent Republican Councilman of Tacoma for the Seventh Ward.

In 1892–93, he was involved in a controversy concerning the purchase of the water plant for the city. There were many discussions and arguments in regard to the price, and  city officials came to doubt the purchase. Later, the politicians who were against the deal changed their minds to support it, and Berry was among them. He stated, "If you don't do it, you will have the Northern Pacific Railroad, the Tacoma Land Company, and the Tacoma Light and Water Company, representing a quarter of the value of the city, against you." Opponents to the purchase included another Washington pioneer, Aaron R. Titlow, who urged the people not to surrender to the corporations.

At the time, a Seattle Post-Intelligencer article alleged that the company selling the plant spent $50,000 ($1,300,000) to support the election in favor of the purchase, and made a deal with the City Council. Eventually, in the March 30 election, it was decided to purchase the plant; 3,200 out of 5,181 votes were in favor of the deal.

Berry ran for office again in 1894. Despite the landslide victory of the Republican party, his candidacy wasn't supported due to his connection with the city "swindles", such as the water plant purchase. However, he re-entered politics in 1904, running among the Republican candidates for the Seventh Council Ward.

Other activities

Berry studied Methodism, and was a member of Epworth Methodist Episcopal church in Tacoma. During the short period of his life in Marion, Illinois, he actively participated in religious work. He was also a member of two fraternal organizations: the Independent Order of Odd Fellows and the Foresters Friendly Society.

Personal life and death

Berry married Lillian M. Ball in Jacksonville, Illinois, in November of 1879. They had four children: Preston A., who later worked as a bookkeeper in Cascade Cereal Company; Grace McCune; John W., who later was the agent for Tacoma Grocery Company; and Harry B.

John Berry died on August 13, 1931, in Tacoma, Washington, and was buried in the Tacoma Cemetery.

See also 
 Cascade Cereal Company
 Panic of 1893
 Independent Order of Odd Fellows 
 Foresters Friendly Society

Notes

References

Literature cited

External links 
 

People from Jacksonville, Illinois
Washington (state) pioneers
Businesspeople from Tacoma, Washington
Politicians from Tacoma, Washington
Washington (state) city council members
Millers
American patent holders